J.P. Koch Fjord is a fjord in Peary Land, northern Greenland. To the west, the fjord opens into the Lincoln Sea of the Arctic Ocean.

It is named after Danish captain and explorer of the Arctic Johan Peter Koch (1870 – 1928),

Geography
The fjord opens to the northwest to the east of Freuchen Land and to the south and west of Nansen Land. The Hans Tausen Ice Cap lies to the east of the inner fjord. The Navarana Fjord branches south in the middle fjord zone. The Henson Glacier discharges from the south at its head and the Expedition Glacier from the east further north from the terminus of the Henson Glacier. 

Sverdrup Island and Elison Island are located to the north of its mouth. John Murray Island lies further off to the NW. Merqujoq Island is located in the inner reaches, in a bend in the fjord.

See also
List of fjords of Greenland
Sirius Passet

References

External links
Henson Gletscher Formation sections in North Greenland
Icy Seas

Fjords of Greenland
Peary Land